Pulford is a surname. Notable people with the surname include:

Andrew Pulford, Royal Air Force officer
Bob Pulford (born 1936), Canadian ice hockey player
Conway Pulford (1892–1942), Royal Air Force officer
Harvey Pulford (1875–1940), Canadian athlete
Jaala Pulford (born 1974), Australian politician
Kate Pulford (born 1980), New Zealand cricketer
Ted Pulford (1914–1994), Canadian painter